Abdón Saavedra Mallea (1872, La Paz – 1942) served as the 22nd vice president of Bolivia from 1926 to 1930, during the presidency of Hernando Siles Reyes. He was brother of president Bautista Saavedra.

References

1872 births
1942 deaths
Vice presidents of Bolivia
Presidents of the Senate of Bolivia
Foreign ministers of Bolivia
Bolivian diplomats